Diamond FM 103.8 FM is Mutare and Manicaland's only commercial radio station. The station broadcasts in English and locally spoken languages and dialects of the region. The radio station is based at Manica Post building. Diamond FM is also available on Livestream.

References

External links

Radio stations in Zimbabwe
Radio stations established in 2015
2015 establishments in Zimbabwe